Marie-Suzanne Giroust (9 March 1734 — 31 August 1772), known as Madame Roslin, was a French painter, miniaturist, and pastellist, known for her portraits. She was a member of the Académie royale de peinture et de sculpture. Only a small number of her works have been identified.

Biography

Marie-Suzanne Giroust was born and lived her whole life in Paris. She was the daughter of Barthélemy Giroust, Jeweller to the King's Wardrobe (d. 1741) and Marie Suzanne Le Roy (d. 1745). Orphaned at an early age, she was raised by relatives. She studied art under Maurice Quentin de La Tour and then of Joseph-Marie Vien. The teachings of Vien, in particular, affected her own art greatly.

Giroust was active as an artist from the 1750s. She met the Swedish artist Alexander Roslin at Vien's studio in 1752. She wished to marry him, but was prevented by her guardian and family, who disliked Roslin because he was poor and a Protestant. After rejecting the suitors suggested by her guardian, she was allowed to marry Roslin after mediation from Roslin's patron, the Comte de Caylus. The marriage occurred on 5 January 1759, with the Swedish ambassador as a witness. The couple had three daughters and three sons.

Giroust was a pastel painter. Her husband once estimated that she was a better pastellist than he was. In 1770, Giroust was admitted to the Académie royale de peinture et de sculpture in Paris. She was one of only fifteen women to be accepted as full academicians in the 145-year history of the institution. Her reception piece, Portrait of the Sculptor Jean-Baptiste Pigalle (1770), was praised by Denis Diderot in 1771 for its "beautiful and strong colors."

Giroust served as a model for La Dame au voile (The Lady with the Veil) (1768), painted by her husband. She also appears in Alexander Roslin's group portrait The Artist and His Wife Marie-Suzanne Giroust Portraying Henrik Wilhelm Peill (1767).

Marie-Suzanne Giroust died of breast cancer in 1772, aged 38.

Notable works
 Self-Portrait with Her Teacher, Maurice Quentin de La Tour (ca. 1760; private collection)
 Portrait of Henrik Vilhelm Peill (1766; private collection)
 Portrait of Jacques Dumont "le Romain" (ca. 1770–71; Musée national des châteaux de Versailles et de Trianon)
 Portrait of the Sculptor Jean-Baptiste Pigalle (1771; Paris, Louvre)
 Portrait of Marie-Joseph Peyre (1771; Stockholm, Nationalmuseum)

Gallery

References

1734 births
1772 deaths
French women painters
Deaths from breast cancer
Deaths from cancer in France
Painters from Paris
Pastel artists
18th-century French painters
18th-century French women artists